Sion Spence (born 2 October 2000) is a Welsh professional footballer who plays as a midfielder for National League North club Gloucester City.

Club career

Cardiff City
Spence started his career at Cardiff City where he was awarded the club's academy player of the year award for the 2017–18 season. Spence was also part of the Cardiff City Under-18s side that was crowned champions of the PDL2 South.

In September 2019, Spence joined Cymru Premier side Barry Town United on loan.

Crystal Palace
Following his release from Cardiff, Spence joined Premier League side Crystal Palace in September 2020, initially joining up with the club's under-23s side.

On 9 July 2021, Spence joined recently-relegated League Two side Bristol Rovers on a season-long loan deal. He made his professional debut in a 2–0 EFL Cup defeat to Cheltenham Town. On 25 September 2021, Spence made his league debut for the club when he came on as a 90th minute substitute for Harvey Saunders against Walsall. He scored to give Rovers a 2–1 victory, the club's first away win for 9 months.

Spence was released by Crystal Palace at the end of the 2021–22 season.

Gloucester City
On 4 August 2022, Spence signed for National League North club Gloucester City on a one-year deal.

International career
In 2016, Spence scored for the Wales under-16 side as they defeated Northern Ireland under-16 side 3–1 to retain the Victory Shield.  He has also represented Wales at under-19 and under-21 level.

In June 2021, Spence was shown a red card whilst representing the U21 team in a 0–0 draw with Moldova. Spence was shown a second yellow card for what was deemed to be simulation, despite having to leave the field on a stretcher on account of the challenge in the opposing penalty area. In October 2021, Spence was called up to the Wales squad for the 2023 UEFA European Under-21 Championship qualifying matches against Moldova and Netherlands on 8 and 12 October 2021 respectively, featuring off of the bench in the 5–0 defeat in the second of the two matches.

Career statistics

References 

2000 births
Living people
Welsh footballers
Wales youth international footballers
Wales under-21 international footballers
Association football midfielders
Cardiff City F.C. players
Barry Town United F.C. players
Crystal Palace F.C. players
Bristol Rovers F.C. players
Gloucester City A.F.C. players
Cymru Premier players
English Football League players
National League (English football) players